The 2005–06 OB I bajnokság season was the 69th season of the OB I bajnokság, the top level of ice hockey in Hungary. Seven teams participated in the league, and Alba Volan Szekesfehervar won the championship.

First round

Qualification round

Playoffs

Semifinals 
 Alba Volán Székesfehérvár - Ferencvárosi TC 3:0 (6:4, 5:2, 6:0) 
 Újpesti TE - Dunaújvárosi AC 3:1 (2:0, 0:2, 3:2, 4:0)

3rd place 
 Dunaújvárosi AC - Ferencvárosi TC 3:2 (3:5, 2:3, 2:0, 3:2, 7:3)

Final 
 Alba Volán Székesfehérvár - Újpesti TE 4:1 (4:0, 3:5, 4:0, 4:1, 7:5)

External links
 Season on hockeyarchives.info

OB I bajnoksag seasons
Hun
OB